Skärhamns IK is a Swedish football club located in Skärhamn in Västra Götaland County.

Background
Since their foundation on 13 October 1932 Skärhamns IK has participated mainly in the middle and lower divisions of the Swedish football league system.  The club currently plays in Division 2 Västra Götaland which is the fourth tier of Swedish football. Their best achievement was from 2006 to 2008 when they played in Division 1 Södra. They play their home matches at the Dan Lindberg Bygg Arena in Skärhamn.

Skärhamns IK are affiliated to the Bohusläns Fotbollförbund.

Season to season

External links
 Skärhamns IK – Official Website

Footnotes

Football clubs in Västra Götaland County
Association football clubs established in 1932
1932 establishments in Sweden